Kurgeh (also Romanized as Kūrgeh and Koorgeh; also known as Kargen and Kūrkeh) is a village in Razmavaran Rural District, in the Central District of Rafsanjan County, Kerman Province, Iran. At the 2006 census, its population was 623, in 157 families.

References 

Populated places in Rafsanjan County